R290 may refer to:
 Ericsson R290, a telephone
 R290 road (Ireland), a regional road in Ireland
 Propane, as used in refrigeration